is a town in Okhotsk Subprefecture, Hokkaido, Japan.

As of September 2016, the town has an estimated population of 4,222 and a population density of 10 persons per km2.

Industry 
Kiyosato is near Mount Shari and uses the spring water to make a distinct variety of shōchū using potatoes grown only in Hokkaido.

Mascot

She is a fairy who is a good dancer. She wears a hat with a potato flower on it, a masu salon hair clipping on her bangs and a pair of wooden snowshoes that resembled Kaminoko Pond. Her body is made of trees from the pond. She dyed her bangs to look the Sakura Falls. She is unveiled on 15 February 2014.

Notable people from Kiyosato
Tomomi Okazaki, speed skater

References

External links

Official Website 

Towns in Hokkaido